Poplar Creek Music Theater was a concert venue located in Hoffman Estates, Illinois.  The amphitheatre opened in 1980 and closed in 1994. It hosted a variety of popular musical acts during its 15-season existence.  It consisted of a covered pavilion and grass seating area, and had a capacity of 25,202 people: 7,202 reserved seats and 18,000 lawn seats.

Attendance began to dwindle in the late 1980s, and Poplar Creek faced competition from the opening of the World Music Theater (now Hollywood Casino Amphitheatre) in Tinley Park in 1990.  Sears acquired the property in 1989 and allowed Poplar Creek to remain in operation until 1994 and demolition began in July 1995.

In 2006, the Sears Centre (as of 2020 the Now Arena) opened in Hoffman Estates, near the former location of Poplar Creek.

A new outdoor theater located next to the Sears Centre, and about one mile away from Poplar Creek's former location, had been approved for construction. With approximately 10,000 seats, this new venue would only be a fraction of Poplar Creek's capacity. However, the great recession and its aftermath have left the project in an indefinite state of uncertainty.

Events

References

External links
Lisa's Web World - Poplar Creek Music Theater
Sears Centre official site
Village of Hoffman Estates - Sears Centre site information
Photo, Aerosmith @ Poplar Creek. Hoffman Estates, IL - July 12, 1984

Music venues in Illinois
Former music venues in the United States
1980 establishments in Illinois
1995 disestablishments in Illinois